Anita Wardell (born 23 August 1961) is an English jazz singer, renowned for her scat singing.

Wardell was born in Guildford, Surrey, in England and raised in Australia. She won the BBC Best of Jazz Award in 2006, and lives in London. She teaches an annual jazz course in the Loire, France. Wardell is an accomplished scat singer and is noted for her vocalised version of Lee Morgan's solo from "Moanin'".

Discography
 Straight Ahead (33 Jazz, 1999)
 Until the Stars Fade (Symbol, 2002)
 Noted (Proper/Specific Jazz)
 Kinda Blue (Specific Jazz, 2008)
 The Road (Specific Jazz, 2013)

References

External links
Official site

1961 births
Living people
People from Guildford
British women jazz singers
English jazz singers
English expatriates in Australia